Tibor Kalina was born on 10 October 1976, in Budapest, he is a Hungarian former football player.

Playing career
He played for more than 11 different teams, during his football career.

Football Coaching
He is now coach at FC Orpund.

External links
 

1976 births
Living people
Footballers from Budapest
Hungarian footballers
Hungarian expatriate footballers
Nemzeti Bajnokság I players
Veikkausliiga players
FC Haka players
Újpest FC players
Győri ETO FC players
SR Delémont players
FC Solothurn players
SC Kriens players
Expatriate footballers in Finland
Expatriate footballers in Switzerland
Association football forwards